Jens Portin (born 13 December 1984) is a retired Finnish association footballer.

He spent his career at FF Jaro in Veikkausliiga and with Gefle IF in Allsvenskan, the Swedish premier division of football. His younger brother Jonas is also a former professional footballer.

References
Guardian Football

1984 births
Living people
Swedish-speaking Finns
Finnish footballers
Finland under-21 international footballers
Finnish expatriate footballers
Finnish expatriate sportspeople in Sweden
Expatriate footballers in Sweden
FF Jaro players
Gefle IF players
Veikkausliiga players
Allsvenskan players
Superettan players
Association football defenders
People from Jakobstad
Sportspeople from Ostrobothnia (region)